The Best of The Vines is a compilation album by The Vines and contains a selection of singles and album tracks from their first three albums released under Capitol Records. The band did not have a say in the release having been dropped by Capitol Records in 2007, however they picked the songs.

Track listing

Personnel
 Craig Nicholls – vocals, guitars, keys, moog
 Ryan Griffiths – guitars, keys, percussion, backing vocals
 Hamish Rosser – drums, percussion, backing vocals
 Dave Oliffe - drums on "Highly Evolved", "Autumn Shade", "Outtathaway", "Homesick" (outro only)
 Joey Waronker - drums on "Get Free"
 Pete Thomas - drums on "Factory", "Homesick" (excerpt)
 Patrick Matthews - bass
 Andy Kent – bass
 Amanda Brown – violin
 Rowan Smith – violin
 Sophie Glasson – cello
 Roger Joseph Manning Jr. - Keyboards

Other Credits
 Rob Schnapf - Additional Guitars ("Homesick" and "Factory"), Producer, Mixing
 Doug Boehm - Engineering, Mixing
 Ted Jensen - Mastering
 Ethan Johns - Additional Percussion ("Get Free", "Autumn Shade", "Factory")
 Andrew Slater - Executive Producer
 Andy Wallace - Mixing ("Get Free")
 Doug Boehm - Engineer
 Steven Rhodes - Additional Percussion ("Get Free", "Autumn Shade", "Factory"), Additional Engineering
 Wayne Connolly – producer, recorder, mixing
 Dan Clinch – additional engineering
 Anthony The – additional engineering
 Veit Mahler – additional engineering

Release history

References

External links
The Vines - Official Website
The Vines Myspace page

The Vines (band) albums
Albums produced by Rob Schnapf
2008 greatest hits albums
Capitol Records compilation albums